Poecilocoris is a genus of shield-backed bugs in the family Scutelleridae. There are more than 20 described species in Poecilocoris, found mainly in south and east Asia, including Indomalaya.

Species
These species belong to the genus Poecilocoris:

 Poecilocoris anisopilus Walker, 1867
 Poecilocoris balteatus (Distant, 1892)
 Poecilocoris capitatus Yang, 1934
 Poecilocoris childreni (White, 1839)
 Poecilocoris crowleyi Distant, 1901
 Poecilocoris dissimilis Martin, 1902
 Poecilocoris druraei (Linnaeus, 1771)
 Poecilocoris latus (Dallas, 1848) (tea seed bug)
 Poecilocoris lewisi (Distant, 1883) (clown stink bug)
 Poecilocoris nepalensis Herrich-Schaeffer, 1837 (Nepal shield-backed bug)
 Poecilocoris nigricollis Horváth, 1912
 Poecilocoris obesus Dallas, 1851
 Poecilocoris orientalis Ahmad & Kamaluddin, 1982
 Poecilocoris ornatus Dallas, 1851
 Poecilocoris plenisignatus Walker, 1867
 Poecilocoris pseudolatus Ahmad & Kamaluddin, 1982
 Poecilocoris pulcher Dallas, 1848
 Poecilocoris purpurascens (Westwood, 1837)
 Poecilocoris rufigenis Dallas, 1851
 Poecilocoris sanszesignatus Yang, 1934
 Poecilocoris splendidulus Esaki, 1935
 Poecilocoris watanabei Matsumura, 1913
 † Poecilocoris rottensis Statz & Wagner, 1950

References

Shield bugs
Pentatomomorpha genera